Cornelius F. Daily (September 11, 1864 – June 14, 1928) was an American professional baseball catcher. He played in Major League Baseball (MLB) for the Providence Grays, Boston Beaneaters, Indianapolis Hoosiers, Brooklyn Ward's Wonders, Brooklyn Grooms, and Chicago Colts between 1885 and 1896.

References

External links

Baseball Almanac
Encyclopedia of Baseball catchers

1864 births
1928 deaths
19th-century baseball players
Major League Baseball catchers
Providence Grays players
Boston Beaneaters players
Indianapolis Hoosiers (NL) players
Brooklyn Ward's Wonders players
Brooklyn Grooms players
Chicago Colts players
Waterbury (minor league baseball) players
Baseball players from Massachusetts
People from Blackstone, Massachusetts
Sportspeople from Worcester County, Massachusetts